1011 Woodland is the eighth studio album by British new wave band the Fixx, released in 1999. All but the last three tracks are re-recordings of previous songs done by the band, largely in an acoustic and modern form.  The final three tracks are live recordings.

Track listing
"Driven Out" (Dan K. Brown, Cy Curnin, Rupert Greenall, Jamie West-Oram, Adam Woods) – 6:14
"Stand or Fall" (Charlie Barrett, Curnin, Greenall, West-Oram) – 5:29
"Woman on a Train" (Brown, Curnin, Greenall, Jeannette Obstoj, West-Oram, Woods) – 6:35
"Outside" (Alfie Agius, Curnin, Greenal, West-Oram, Woods) – 8:33
"Secret Separation" (Brown, Curnin, Greenall, Obstoj, West-Oram, Wood) – 5:38
"Cameras in Paris" (Barrett, Curnin, Greenall, West-Oram) – 5:11
"Wish" (Brown, Curnin, Greenall, West-Oram, Woods) – 5:58
"One Jungle" (The Fixx) – 3:32
"I Will" (Brown, Curnin, Greenall, West-Oram, Woods) – 4:36
"Saved by Zero" (Agius, Curnin, Greenal, West-Oram, Woods) – 5:53
"Lost Planes" (Barrett, Curnin, Greenall, West-Oram) – 3:25
"Precious Stone" (The Fixx, Woods) – 4:36
"Still Around" (The Fixx) – 4:55
"Two Different Views" (Curnin, Greenall, West-Oram, Woods) – 3:35
"Red Skies" (Barrett, Curnin, Greenall, West-Oram, Woods) – 4:42
"One Thing Leads to Another" (Agius, Curnin, Greenall, West-Oram, Woods) – 3:23
"Deeper and Deeper" (Curnin, West-Oram) – 4:33

Personnel
Cy Curnin – vocals
Adam Woods – drums
Rupert Greenall – keyboards
Jamie West-Oram – guitar

Additional personnel
Jannelle Guillot – voiceover
Chris Tait – bass

Production
Producer: The Fixx
Executive producers: Bob Michaels, John Trickett
Engineer: Chris Stone
Assistant engineers: Tye Bellar, John Zajdel
Mixing: Chris Haynes, Martin Rex
Mastering: Stephen Marcussen, Charlie Watts
Recording assistant: Jeff Steven
Production coordination: Melinda Pepler
Quality control: Randy Glenn
Art direction: Dan Russo
Video Director: Lee Chambers
Design: Jena Petsch
Graphic design: Rupesh Pattni
Photography: Lisa Bell, Dave Rogers, Ed Spyra
Liner notes: Cy Curnin

References

The Fixx albums
1999 albums
CMC International albums